Elmbridge Open Space or Elmbridge Meadows is a Local Nature Reserve in Berrylands in the Royal Borough of Kingston upon Thames in London. It is a linear open space along the western bank of the Hogsmill River which starts at Malden Way and ends at a path between Surbiton Hill Park to Green Lane. 

The site has a variety of names. It is part of the Hogsmill Valley Site of Borough Importance for Nature Conservation, Grade I. It is also called the northern Hogsmill River Park, but Kingston Council has designated a closed wood east of the Hogsmill and north of the A3 road as Hogsmill River Park Local Nature Reserve.

The London Loop long-distance walk passes through the site.

References

Nature reserves in the Royal Borough of Kingston upon Thames
Local nature reserves in Greater London